The Day Skipper qualification confirms that the successful candidate has the knowledge needed to skipper a yacht on shorter, coastal cruises during daylight. The Royal Yachting Association administers the qualification, although most of the training is carried out by private companies.

It is a part of a series of qualifications that include Competent Crew, Helmsman, Coastal Skipper and Yachtmaster. While the qualification is primarily for the United Kingdom, it is widely recognised internationally.

The course has two elements, a theory and practical. Candidates must complete the theory part of the course first to be able to apply this knowledge during the practical course.

Some sailing Schools holding RYA recognition may allow Day Skipper training without first taking the shore-based course, if the student can navigate up to Day Skipper standards. However, theory knowledge will still be tested while out on the water.

RYA Recognised sailing Schools are displayed on the RYA website.

Day Skipper Theory 
The theory part of the Day Skipper qualification is either a shorebased (classroom) course that takes a minimum of 40 hours, followed by an exam. Alternatively, this can be completed online by distance learning which offers greater flexibility in study.

Course Content includes:
 Nautical terminology
 Ropework - knots and rope types
 Anchors and anchoring
 Safety, including safety equipment, fire, personal safety equipment such as harnesses and life jackets, distress signals and rescue procedures
 International regulations for preventing collisions at sea 
 Measuring position, course and speed
 Using navigational charts and publications
 Using electronic charts and chartplotters
 Using navigational instruments
 Planning and navigation a course
 Understanding tides, Tide tables
 Calculating heights of tide using tidal curves
 Lighthouses and beacons
 Buoyage systems, IALA A and IALA B
 Weather and meteorology
 Planning a passage
 Navigation in restricted visibility
 Pilotage, pilotage plans and harbour entry
 Environmental awareness

Day Skipper Practical 
The practical element of the day skipper course takes approximately 5 days on board a suitable yacht, and can be taken in tidal or non-tidal waters.

The Day Skipper Practical Course includes:
 Preparing a yacht for sea, including engine, sails and gear.
 Deck work, including reefing, shaking out reefs, changing sails, preparing an anchor, mooring, anchoring, weighing anchor
 Practical navigation – taking and plotting visual fixes, electronic navigation equipment, estimating tidal heights, steering to allow for tidal stream, leeway and drift, navigational records, echo sounders and lead lines
 Pilotage, including pilotage plans for entry or departure from a harbour
 Meteorology, weather and forecasts
 Maintenance and repair work
 Engines, refuelling and emergency maintenance
 Victualing
 Emergency drills, including Man overboard, distress flares, life rafts, VHF radio, securing a tow, helicopter rescue
 Organising and keeping a watch
 Yacht Handling under power
 Yacht handling under sail
 Passage making – planning and making a coastal passage

Day Skipper Requirements 
There are no practical qualification requirements, but it is recommended that participants are at least Competent Crew standard before taking the Practical course. Participants should have 5 days, 100 miles and 4 night hours on board a sailing yacht and theory knowledge to Day Skipper level. Minimum age is 16.

See also
Competent Crew
Coastal Skipper
Yachtmaster

References

External links 
 Royal Yachting Association

Sailing qualifications